Israel competed at the World Games 2017 in Wroclaw, Poland, from 20 July 2017 to 30 July 2017.

Competitors

Gymnastic
Israel has qualified at the 2017 World Games:

Rhythmic Gymnastics – 1 quota

Muaythai
Israel has qualified at the 2017 World Games:

Men's -63.5 kg - 1 quota (Itay Guyer)
Women's -60  kg – 1 quota (Nili Block)

References 

Nations at the 2017 World Games
2017 in Israeli sport
2017